Upper North Philadelphia is a section of Philadelphia that is immediately north of Lower North Philadelphia, and can be described as an area that has a "...large and rapidly growing Puerto Rican population".

According to the planning commission, Upper North Philadelphia officially consists of the Allegheny West, Fairhill, Glenwood, Hunting Park, and Nicetown-Tioga neighborhoods. Bounded by York Street to the south, Front Street to the east, Roosevelt Expressway to the north, and Ridge Avenue to the west.

Demographics
The demographics of Upper North Philadelphia shows that the area has a population density of 12,241 people per mile with an average household size of 3 and 37% of households had children.  There is a 17% annual residential turnover rate with 47% of residents staying for more than 5 years, with an average of 6 years of residency. The majority of residents are African Americans and Puerto Ricans.

Racial demographics
 Non-Hispanic Black: 106,559 (58.7%)
 Hispanic or Latino of any race: 62,083 (34.2%)
 Mixed or Other: 4,901 (2.7%)
 Non-Hispanic White: 3,994 (2.2%)
 Asian: 3,990 (2.2%)

References

 
Neighborhoods in Philadelphia